Bosing is an unsophisticated method for the discovery of buried archaeological features such as pits and ditches dug into a thin substratum of rock, such as limestone or chalk. The technique involves hitting a block of wood laid over the ground surface with a weighty hammer and assessing the sound given out. For example, if the wood gave out a heavy thudding sound, then this would indicate that the underlying bedrock had been disturbed while undisturbed bedrock would emit a thinner and sharper tone.  Methodically repeating the process across an area and noting the sound pattern will reveal the extent of the underground features.

References

Sources

 

Geological techniques
Archaeological science
 Methods in archaeology